Love 2 is the fifth studio album by French electronic music duo Air, released on 30 September 2009 in Japan and in the first week of October in the rest of the world by Virgin Records. It is the duo's first production recorded at their own recording facility, Studio Atlas, in northern Paris. As of February 2012, Love 2 had sold 24,000 copies in the United States, according to Nielsen SoundScan.

Release
On 6 July 2009, a viral single, "Do the Joy", was made available as a free download to existing Air newsletter subscribers. The album's official lead single, "Sing Sang Sung", was released digitally on 25 August 2009. An album mashup was made available to UK newsletter subscribers on 14 September 2009. The album was streamed worldwide for an interactive "listening party" on 28 September 2009, starting at 12:00 CET, for exactly 24 hours. Track names were not shown, but the album was played in order. Fans were also given the opportunity to comment on the album via Facebook, and their comments were displayed adjacent to the media player, as well as an updating Google Maps view of where listeners were.

Track listing

Personnel
Credits adapted from the liner notes of Love 2.

 Air – production
 Joey Waronker – drums, percussions 
 Stéphane "Alf" Briat – mixing 
 Louis Arlette – sound engineering
 Chab – mastering
 Luciana Val and Franco Musso – photos
 Laurent Pinon – artwork

Charts

References

2009 albums
Air (French band) albums
Virgin Records albums